

Squad

Current technical staff

Transfers

In

Out 

For Last Season's Transfers List Please visit 2010–11 Al Wasl F.C. season

Tournaments

Pre-Season Matches & Friendlies

Local Camp
Al Wasl has abandoned its annual habit of traveling to Europe for summer pre-season training camp as per the instructions of coach Diego Maradona.  The new coach decided to set up camp at home as it clashes with the Holy Month of Ramadan where all the players would be fasting during the day, making it difficult to set up an external training camp. The Internal camp included two matches against lower division clubs only.

Results
Kickoff times are in UAE Time (GMT+4).

Top Scorers

UAE Pro League 2011–12

Standing

Results by round

Results
Kickoff times are in UAE Time (GMT+4).

Top Scorers

2012 GCC Champions League

Al Wasl FC is back to this regional competition after 2 years of winning it in the 2010 Tournament. This time Al Wasl enters after losing its chances in winning the 2011–12 UAE Pro-League and the 2011–12 UAE President's Cup, which makes the 2012 GCC Champions League a good opportunity to salvage its current season.

Standing

Results

Top Scorers

UAE President's Cup 2011–12

The President Cup's draw has put Al Wasl in a very difficult side of the elimination matrix. All the matches were considered early finals, starting with a match against Al-Ahli Dubai that ended with a historic 4–0 win for Al Wasl. The next match was set against Al Wahda S.C.C. which was behind the elimination of Al Wasl FC in the previous UAE President's Cup 2011–12. Al Wahda S.C.C. was able to eliminate Al Wasl FC again, sending them to a very early summer after losing the chance on competing in the only obtainable major trophy in the season after the team's position in the Pro League to 7th after losing to Dubai Club, few days from the Cup's Quarterfinals.

Results
Kickoff times are in UAE Time (GMT+4).

Top Scorers

Etisalat Cup 2011–12

The Etisalat Cup is a gap-filler between the official tournaments. It does not involve the International Players. It was the first tournament of the season, and the first ever official appearance for the Legendary Diego Maradona in the UAE as Al Wasl FC Coach. Al Wasl reached the Semifinal after a fierce group-round race, and then lost 0–1 in the Semifinal despite displaying a decent performance.

Standing

Results

Top Scorers

Season Top scorers

Last updated on 6 June 2012

Season Highlights
 By finishing 8th in the UAE Pro-League at the end of the season, Al Wasl has matched its all-time worst position in the League.
 Al Wasl's Goalkeeper Majed Nasser received a 17-match ban and been fined Dh30,000 (€6,200) after slapping Ahli Dubai's coach Quique Flores after the semi-final of the Etisalat Cup.
 Al Wasl was fined 5 times and received 3 Home Match ban punishments from the United Arab Emirates Football Association totaling 6 games.
 Al Wasl ended the first leg of the UAE Pro-League with a 5 match winning drought. It ended the second leg of the tournament with an even worse 6 matches winning drought.
 Al Wasl played Dubai Club, the recently promoted and relegation contender, 4 times in the 2011–2012 season. It lost them all (0–5, 1–2, 0–3, and 2–5), scoring 3 and conceding 15.

Other Seasons
 2008–09 Al Wasl FC season
 2009–10 Al Wasl FC season
 2010–11 Al Wasl FC season

See also
 2011–12 UAE Pro-League
 Al Wasl FC
 Al Wasl SC

References

Al Wasl
2012